Guidotti is an Italian surname derived from the masculine personal name Guido. Notable people with the surname include:

 Bobby Guidotti, 1969–70 member of The Box Tops, American rock band, formed in Memphis in 1967
 Galgano Guidotti (1148–1181), Italian Catholic saint
 Luisa Guidotti Mistrali (1932–1979), Italian Roman Catholic missionary in Zimbabwe 
 Paolo Guidotti, also known as il Borghese (1559–1629), Italian painter, sculptor and architect
 Salvatore Guidotti (1836–after 1889), Italian painter
 Stefano Guidotti (born 1999), Swiss footballer

See also 
 27270 Guidotti, a main-belt asteroid named after Guido Guidotti
 Guidotti–Greenspan rule, for which country's reserves should equal short-term external debt 
 Guidi

Italian-language surnames